Ram Bahadur Thapa, also widely known by his nom de guerre   Badal,  is a Nepali politician and former Minister for Home Affairs. He is the vice president of CPN (UML).

Political life 
Before the establishment of the Nepal Communist Party, he was General Secretary of the Communist Party of Nepal (Maoist Centre). He was formerly the member of National Assembly from Bagmati Province.

Thapa was the Minister for Defence during the Katawal incident , which led to the resignation of Pushpa Kamal Dahal.

Thapa led a group of MPs, MLAs and fellow leaders who joined CPN (UML) leaving CPN (Maoist Centre) following the split in Nepal Communist Party.

Electoral history

2008 Constituent Assembly election

See also
2021 split in Communist Party of Nepal (Maoist Centre)
KP Sharma Oli

References

Living people
Nepal Communist Party (NCP) politicians
Communist Party of Nepal (Unified Marxist–Leninist) politicians
Members of the National Assembly (Nepal)
Government ministers of Nepal
People of the Nepalese Civil War
People from Gulmi District
1955 births
Members of the 1st Nepalese Constituent Assembly